"Soul Deep" is a song by Swedish pop music duo Roxette, released on 17 February 1987 by EMI as the third single from their debut album, Pearls of Passion (1986). The song was originally written in Swedish by Per Gessle, and was called "Dansar nerför ditt stup i rekordfart" ("Dancing Down Your Dive in Record Speed"), although Gessle later wrote new English lyrics for the song after deciding its Swedish lyrics were "too silly". The single was only released in Sweden, Germany and Canada. It spent three consecutive weeks at number 18 on the Swedish Singles Chart, but failed to chart in the other two countries.

The song was backed by the previously unreleased title track from their debut album, which would later see a wider release as the b-side to their 1992 single "Queen of Rain", and also as a bonus track on the 1997 reissue of Pearls of Passion. 12" editions of the single contain an extended mix of the a-side. This remix was created by Kaj Erixon and can also be found on the remix compilation Dance Passion, released in March 1987. A re-arranged and remixed version of "Soul Deep" later appeared on the duo's 1991 album Joyride.

Formats and track listings
All music and lyrics written by Per Gessle.

 7" Single (Germany / Sweden 1362557 · Canada B-73032)
 "Soul Deep"  – 3:52
 "Pearls of Passion" – 3:33

 12" Single (Germany 1362626)
 "Soul Deep"  – 5:17
 "Pearls of Passion" – 3:33

 Promo 12" Single (Sweden PRO-4077 · Canada SPRO-336)
 "Soul Deep"  – 5:17
 "Soul Deep"  – 3:52

Personnel
Credits adapted from the liner notes of The Rox Box/Roxette 86–06.

 Recorded at EMI Studios in Stockholm, Sweden in September 1986.

Musicians
 Marie Fredriksson – lead and background vocals
 Per Gessle – background vocals
 Per "Pelle" Alsing – drums
 Tommy Cassemar – bass guitar
 Marianne Flynner – background vocals
 Uno Forsberg – trumpet
 Jonas Isacsson – electric guitar
 Clarence Öfwerman – keyboards and production
 Mats Persson – percussion
 Mikael Renlinden – trumpet
 Anne-Lie Rydé – background vocals
 Tomas Sjörgen – trumpet
 Alar Suurna – engineering and mixing

Charts

References

1987 singles
Roxette songs
Songs written by Per Gessle